Mark D. Benigni (born 1972) is the former Mayor of Meriden, Connecticut, USA. Benigni was re-elected three times.

Benigni earned a bachelor's degree in business from Western Connecticut State University, and master's and doctorate degrees in education from the University of Hartford.  After serving on the Meriden City Council, he was first elected mayor as an independent in 2001.

On June 30, 2008, Benigni resigned as mayor to take a position as Cromwell High School's  Principal.

On July 1, 2010, Benigni left Cromwell High School to become the Superintendent of Meriden Public Schools.

References

Living people
1972 births
Mayors of places in Connecticut
Politicians from Meriden, Connecticut
Western Connecticut State University alumni
University of Hartford alumni